Palazuelos is a Spanish surname. Notable people with the surname include:

Roberto Palazuelos (born 1967), Mexican actor, model, and producer
Rubén Palazuelos (born 1983), Spanish footballer
Susana Palazuelos (born c. 1935), Mexican chef and businesswoman

See also
Pablo Palazuelo (1916–2007), Spanish painter and sculptor

Spanish-language surnames